Acacia incrassata is a shrub belonging to the genus Acacia and the subgenus Phyllodineae that is endemic to south western Australia.

Description
It is able to spread by subterranean runners. The prominently ribbed branchlets have soft silky hairs that are usually sparsely distributed and mostly found on the ribs. Like most species of Acacia it has phyllodes rather than true leaves. It produces yellow flowers from June to August.

Distribution
It is native to an area along the west coast in the Wheatbelt and Peel regions of Western Australia where they are often situated in lateritic soils. The bulk of the population is found from around Mount Lesueur in the north down to around Kalamunda in the south and also from around Serpentine and Watheroo where it is found in loamy soils in as a part of Eucalyptus wandoo woodlands or loamy gravelly soils in low heath communities.

See also
List of Acacia species

References

incrassata
Acacias of Western Australia
Taxa named by William Jackson Hooker
Plants described in 1841